Scopula phyxelis is a moth of the  family Geometridae. It is found in Costa Rica.

References

Moths described in 1938
phyxelis
Moths of Central America